Cressie H. Thigpen, Jr. is a North Carolina lawyer and jurist who served on the North Carolina Court of Appeals.

Early life and education
Thigpen was born August 12, 1946. He received his bachelor's degree in business administration from North Carolina Central University in 1966 and his law degree from Rutgers University in 1973. He is a veteran of the Peace Corps.

Career 
Thigpen served as a special superior court judge from May 2008 until his 2010 appointment to the Court of Appeals. Previously, he was a partner in the law firm now known as Blue, Stephens & Fellers.

In 1999, he was elected president of the state bar – the first African-American to hold that post.

He has served as chairman of the board of trustees of North Carolina Central University, and has served on the board of trustees for the University of North Carolina at Chapel Hill.

Court of Appeals 
Governor Bev Perdue appointed Thigpen to the Court of Appeals in August 2010 to replace Judge James A. Wynn, who had been appointed to the U.S. Court of Appeals. In the election that followed in November 2010, Thigpen lost to former Judge Douglas McCullough in what was the state's first use of instant runoff voting for a statewide election. Thigpen was then appointed by Gov. Perdue to fill a different seat on the Court of Appeals, which became vacant when Barbara Jackson won election to the North Carolina Supreme Court. He then ran in the 2012 election to retain his seat. Thigpen was endorsed by the (Raleigh) News and Observer, which wrote, "Thigpen has performed well on the court, and has long legal experience and a record of service to the region and state." He was also endorsed by former Court of Appeals Chief Judge Sidney S. Eagles, Jr. and former Supreme Court Chief Justices Henry Frye and Burley Mitchell. Nevertheless, Thigpen was defeated in the 2012 election by Chris Dillon.

References

Thigpen Campaign site
Perdue Appoints Thigpen to North Carolina Court of Appeals
NCCU trustee gets judgeship

1946 births
Living people
21st-century American judges
African-American judges
North Carolina Central University alumni
North Carolina Court of Appeals judges
Peace Corps volunteers
Rutgers University alumni
21st-century African-American people
20th-century African-American people